The James Madison Museum located in Orange, Virginia is a museum dedicated to 4th president of the United States James Madison and his wife, Dolley Madison.  Exhibits include original furniture used by James Madison, his personal items, portraits of the Madisons, and a statue.

Due to Madison's reputation as a farmer, the museum also features a collection of  antique farm tools.  There is also a partially reconstructed 1733 house to demonstrate building practices.

References

External links
 James Madison Museum

Museums in Orange County, Virginia
History museums in Virginia
Presidential museums in Virginia
Farm museums in Virginia
James Madison